Nanophyton is a genus of flowering plants belonging to the family Amaranthaceae.

Its native range is Southern European Russia to Mongolia.

Species
Species:

Nanophyton botschantzevii 
Nanophyton erinaceum 
Nanophyton grubovii 
Nanophyton iliense 
Nanophyton mongolicum 
Nanophyton narynense 
Nanophyton pulvinatum 
Nanophyton saxatile

References

Amaranthaceae
Amaranthaceae genera